Pilar Ramírez Laguna (February 28, 1964 – May 24, 2017) was a Mexican competitor in women's synchronized swimming. She represented her native country at the 1984 Summer Olympics, and claimed the bronze medal in duet at the 1983 Pan American Games in Caracas alongside Claudia Novelo.

References

1964 births
2017 deaths
Mexican synchronized swimmers
Olympic synchronized swimmers of Mexico
Synchronized swimmers at the 1984 Summer Olympics
Pan American Games bronze medalists for Mexico
Pan American Games medalists in synchronized swimming
Synchronized swimmers at the 1983 Pan American Games
Medalists at the 1983 Pan American Games